Sichan may refer to:
 Sichan, Kurdistan
 Sichan, Markazi
 Sichan, South Khorasan